Taj Muhammad Afridi is a Pakistani politician who is currently a member of Senate of Pakistan.

Personal life
He is brother of Alhaj Shah Jee Gul Afridi.

He owns an oil refinery and is a partner in FAW Group.

He worked as a contractor for the NATO in Afghanistan.

Political career
He was elected to the Senate of Pakistan as an independent candidate in 2015 Pakistani Senate election.

References

Living people
Pakistani senators (14th Parliament)
Taj Muhammad
Pakistani businesspeople
Year of birth missing (living people)